WSPP-LP (93.5 FM) is a radio station licensed to Hopkinsville, Kentucky, United States.  The station is currently owned by Immaculate Heart Radio Association.

References

External links
EWTN 
 

SPP-LP
Hopkinsville, Kentucky
SPP-LP